Emil Carlebach (10 July 1914, Frankfurt, Hesse-Nassau - 9 April 2001) was a Hessian Landtag member, a writer, and a journalist. He was born and died in Frankfurt am Main.

Life
Emil Carlebach was descended from a family of rabbis who had practiced in Germany for generations. However, at the time he was born, his father was the only non-religious member of the Carlebach family in Frankfurt. While still young, Emil turned away from the conservative secular attitude of his parents and in 1932 he joined the Young Communist League of Germany (Kommunistischer Jugendverband Deutschlands) KJVD.

In early 1934, he was sentenced to three years in prison for spreading anti-fascist union publications. When the sentence was completed in 1937, he was sent to Dachau concentration camp and then imprisoned at Buchenwald in 1938. At Buchenwald, he was active in the illegal resistance organization. Following plans he designed, he launched "with the call to mutiny on 4 April 1945." He was to have been shot by the SS on 6 April 1945, for his efforts in the camp revolt, but was hidden by other prisoners and survived till liberation. After the liberation of the concentration camp, the prisoners from Buchenwald chose him as their spokesman; later he became the vice-president of the International Buchenwald Committee.

After 1946, he became first a Frankfurt city council member, then a member of the Hessian parliament, where he worked on the Hesse constitution.

Carlebach was one of seven original licensees of the Frankfurter Rundschau, a licensed daily newspaper based in Frankfurt and the first licensed newspaper in the American Zone of Occupation in Germany.  In 1947, without explanation, the U.S. Military Government in Germany revoked Carlebach's publisher's license. He was also a co-founder of the Union of Persecutees of the Nazi Regime (Vereinigung der Verfolgten des Naziregimes) or VVN.

In the early 1950s a fierce dispute began between Carlebach and Margarete Buber-Neumann over the torture of German communists by Joseph Stalin in the Soviet Union. Carlebach contested Stalin’s responsibility; he maintained this position his entire life. In connection with this dispute and later publications, Carlebach’s conduct towards those Buchenwald prisoners who he did not consider loyal communists was also criticized. Because of this, his former fellow prisoner, Benedikt Kautsky, accused him of being partially responsible for the death of least two Polish prisoners.

After the West German Communist Party of Germany (KPD) was banned in 1956, he fled to the Deutsche Demokratische Republik (DDR, East Germany). There he was a staff member for the Deutscher Freiheitssender 904 (German Freedom Radio 904). After his return to the Bundesrepublik Deutschland (BRD, West Germany) he was active in the VVN, the German Communist Party (DKP) and the Deutsche Journalistinnen- und Journalisten-Union (dju, Union of German Journalists) until his death.

Literary works 
 Am Anfang stand ein Doppelmord
 Tote auf Urlaub - Kommunist in Deutschland Dachau und Buchenwald 1937-1945
 Zensur ohne Schere Die Gründerjahre der Frankfurter Rundschau 1945/47
 Hitler war kein Betriebsunfall- Hinter den Kulissen der Weimarer Republik
 Meldung als Waffe
 Kauf Dir einen Minister
 Von Brünning zu Hitler
 Buchenwald. Ein Konzentrationslager  (by Emil Carlebach and Paul Grünewald, Hellmuth Röder, Willy Schmidt, Walter Vielhauer)

Films 
 Emil Carlebach - Kommunist Dokumentarfilm 1998 KAOS art and video archive

References

Other sources 
 Emil Carlebach, Zensur ohne Schere.  Die Gründerjahre der 'Frankfurter Rundschau' 1945/1947 (Frankfurt, a.M.: Röderberg-Verlag, 1985)
 Ephraim Carlebach Stiftung (Ed.), Die Carlebachs: Eine Rabbinerfamilie aus Deutschland, Hamburg 1995
 Hans Schafranek, Zwischen NKWD und Gestapo, Frankfurt/M, 1990, Dokumentenanhang
 Lutz Niethammer (Ed.). Der "gesäuberte" Antifaschismus. Die SED und die roten Kapos von Buchenwald. Dokumente. Berlin, 1994
 Wolfgang Kraushaar, Sonnenuntergang - Das Verhältnis europäischer Intellektueller zum Kommunismus im Spiegel dreier Prozesse, in: Linke Geisterfahrer: Denkanstöße für eine antitotalitäre Linke, Frankfurt/M 2001

External links 
 
 Interview with Emil Carlebach

1914 births
2001 deaths
Politicians from Frankfurt
People from Hesse-Nassau
German people of Jewish descent
Communist Party of Germany politicians
German Communist Party politicians
Union of Persecutees of the Nazi Regime members
German male journalists
Journalists from Frankfurt
Emil
Dachau concentration camp survivors
Buchenwald concentration camp survivors
German male writers
West German defectors to East Germany